Manolis Smyrlakis (born 11 June 1999) is a Greek professional footballer who plays as a defensive midfielder.

References

1999 births
Living people
Greek footballers
Super League Greece 2 players
Football League (Greece) players
Platanias F.C. players
Association football midfielders
Footballers from Thessaloniki